Ingichka is an urban-type settlement in Samarkand Region, Uzbekistan. Administratively, it is part of the city Kattakurgan. The town population in 1989 was 9,676 people.

References

Populated places in Samarqand Region
Urban-type settlements in Uzbekistan